Thambi Durai is a 1997 Indian Tamil-language film, directed by Senthilnathan and produced by K. Santhamani. The film stars Saravanan, Sukanya and M. N. Nambiar. The film was completed in 1994 but had a delayed release in 1997.

Plot
The film starts with narration that the film is based on real event happened at Irukkangudi. Thambidurai (Saravanan) who stays with his grandfather (MN Nambiar) is a poor boatman falls in love with a rich girl Shenbagam (Sukanya) who is tortured by her rich stepmother (Manjula Vijayakumar). Thambidurai and Shenbagam elope and get married.

Shenbagam's uncle (Nalinikanth) who wants to marry her together plots with a womanising landlord (Senthilnathan) to separate them. They murder Thambidurai's grandfather and Shenbagam's grandmother. They approach a sorcerer (Bayilvan Ranganathan) who indulges in black magic. Sorcerer with his magic makes Thambidurai almost dead. Thambidurai is presumed to be dead, however he is taken care by a priest (Shanmugasundaram). Shenbagam is forced to dress up as a widow. Landlord also murders Shenbagam's sister (Mounika) and his own wife by setting up a bomb in tiffin box.

In the climax, by the blessings of goddess, landlord dies by suffering from fits. Thambidurai survives from the magic and Nalinikanth gets killed by Manjula.

Cast
Saravanan as Thambidurai
Sukanya as Shenbagam
M. N. Nambiar
Vadivukkarasi
Mounika
Manjula Vijayakumar
Nalinikanth
Senthilnathan
Chinni Jayanth
K. Natraj

Soundtrack
The music was composed by Ilaiyaraaja.

References

External links

1997 films
1990s Tamil-language films
Films scored by Ilaiyaraaja
Indian action drama films
Films directed by Senthilnathan
1990s action drama films